Always Has Been is an EP by indie hip hop artist J-Live, released in 2003 on Triple Threat Productions. It consists of six songs recorded early in J-Live's career, prior to the release of his first album The Best Part. It was released simultaneously with Always Will Be, another EP by J-Live.

The tracks "Braggin Writes" and "Schools In" were rerecorded for The Best Part. The tracks "Longevity", "Can I Get It", and "Hush the Crowd" had not been released on either of J-Live's previous albums.

Track listing 

"Longevity" - (5:09)
"Braggin Writes" - (3:12)
"Can I Get It" - (4:11)
"Hush the Crowd" - (4:31)
"Braggin Writes (Dome Cracker Remix)" - (3:49)
"Schools In" - (4:39)

References

J-Live albums
2003 EPs
Hip hop EPs